Motion Equity Partners is a private equity firm focused on leveraged buyout and growth capital investments in European middle-market companies across a range of industries.

The firm, has office in Paris.  It was founded in 1989 as Electra Partners Europe and affiliate of Electra Private Equity, a listed investment trust.  The firm has raised approximately €2.5 billion since inception across three funds.

History
Motion Equity Partners raised its first fund in 2000, with €1.0 billion of investor commitments.  Among the investments in that portfolio were Rank Leisure, Azelis, Baxi, Safety-Kleen, Aliplast, Global Solutions, Covenant Healthcare, Ashbourne Healthcare and Diana Ingrédients.

In 2005, it completed a spinout from its investment trust parent.  It raised its second fund the following year, with total commitments amounting to €1.25 billion.

Led by Managing Partner Patrick Eisenchteter, the firm rebranded as Motion Equity Partners in 2011 as it refocused its activities on its best-performing office, Paris. In 2014, the firm  raised a €150m fund, and made three investments in Cellular Line (Italy, 2014), CDL (France, 2014) and Altaïr (France, 2016).
In 2018, the firm raised a new fund, and has made so far investments in Minlay (France, 2017), EA Pharma (France, 2017) and Holweg Weber (France, 2017).

See also

Electra Private Equity

References

External links
Motion Equity Partners (company website)
Cognetas in debt talks at clutch of portfolio cos.  Reuters, Jan 22, 2009
Cognetas to stand by Covenant despite writing equity to zero.  July 22, 2009
Cognetas reveals Europe job cuts.  Dow Jones Financial News, December 19, 2008

Private equity firms of Europe